Sir John Holland, 1st Baronet (October 1603 – 19 January 1701) was an English politician who sat in the House of Commons  at various times  between 1640 and 1679.

Holland was the son of Sir Thomas Holland of Quiddenham, Norfolk and his wife Mary Knyvet, daughter of Sir Thomas Knyvet. He was created a baronet, of Quiddenham by King Charles 1 on 15 June 1629.

In April 1640, Holland was elected Member of Parliament for Norfolk in the Short Parliament. His fellow parliamentarians asked Holland to rid his house of any Catholics, but he refused. He offered his wife, Alathea Panton, religious freedom but he took great but unsuccessful efforts to try and ensure that his children were all Protestants.

In November 1640 he was elected MP Castle Rising in the Long Parliament and held the seat until he was excluded in Pride's Purge in 1648. Holland was re-elected for Castle Rising in the Convention Parliament in 1660.  In 1661 he was elected MP for Aldeburgh in the Cavalier Parliament and held the seat to 1679.
 
Holland died on 19 January 1701, aged 96.

Private life
Holland married a Catholic, Alathea Panton, daughter of John Panton of Bruinshop, Denbighshire, and widow of William, Lord Sandys, of the Vine. Their daughter, Catherine, was born in 1637 and struggled against her father's wish that she should be a Protestant. She became a nun, noted in Bruges. Their son, Thomas, predeceased him, and he was succeeded in the baronetcy by his grandson, Sir John Holland, 2nd Baronet.

References

 
 
 

1603 births
1701 deaths
Baronets in the Baronetage of England
People from Quidenham
People from Aldeburgh
English MPs 1640 (April)
English MPs 1640–1648
English MPs 1660
English MPs 1661–1679
Members of the Parliament of England for Norfolk